is a Japanese politician who has served in the Diet of Japan since 1980. Kyuma graduated from the University of Tokyo in 1964 and worked for the Ministry of Agriculture. He was elected to the Nagasaki Prefectural Assembly in 1971 serving three terms before being elected to the Diet as a member of the Liberal Democratic Party (LDP) for Nagasaki Number 2.

Kyūma is affiliated to the openly revisionist lobby Nippon Kaigi.

Defense Minister
Kyūma served as the Director General of the Japan Defense Agency from 1996 to 1998 under then Prime Minister Ryutaro Hashimoto. He served in a variety of LDP posts in Jun'ichirō Koizumi's cabinet. He again became responsible for Director General of the Japan Defense Agency in September 2006. He would be the last head of the JDA before the Ministry of Defense was created for which he was the first holder of the title.

Controversial remarks
In September 2006, shortly after he was appointed Defense Minister, Kyūma stated that the Chinese military was a concern, contradicting earlier comments that he had made referring to China's military as a threat.

In December 2006, Kyūma claimed that although former Prime Minister Jun'ichirō Koizumi supported the U.S.-led invasion of Iraq, the invasion did not have the official support of the Japanese government. He later had to withdraw his remarks, admitting that the Japanese "Cabinet officially adopted a unified view supporting the U.S.-led war." On 24 January 2007 he said that the U.S. decision to invade Iraq was a mistake.

In January 2007 he criticized the United States over not getting the approval of Okinawa's governor during efforts to relocate the Marine Corps Air Station Futenma. The base and its relocation has been a source of friction between the residents of Okinawa and the U.S. government.

Resignation
Kyūma resigned as Defense Minister on 3 July 2007 for remarks made at Reitaku University in Kashiwa, Chiba Prefecture on 30 June. In this speech, he stated "I now have come to accept in my mind that in order to end the war, it could not be helped that an atomic bomb was dropped on Nagasaki and that countless numbers of people suffered great tragedy." He appeared on a Fuji TV morning news show on 1 July, saying he did not think an apology would be necessary, but he apologized later the same day. When this would not calm the critics, Kyūma finally submitted his resignation on 3 July. Asked about the reason for his resignation, Kyūma is quoted as saying that he did not want his comments to become a "minus" for the Prime Minister. Yuriko Koike was appointed his successor the same day.

Honours
From the Japanese Wikipedia
Grand Cordon of the Order of the Rising Sun (29 April 2013)

References

External links

|-

|-

|-

|-

|-

1940 births
Living people
University of Tokyo alumni
Japanese defense ministers
Members of the House of Representatives (Japan)
Tenrikyo
Members of Nippon Kaigi
Politicians from Nagasaki Prefecture
Liberal Democratic Party (Japan) politicians
21st-century Japanese politicians